Lake Otradnoye is a lake on Karelian Isthmus, in Priozersky District of Leningrad Oblast, south of the town of Priozersk.

The lake is the source of the Pionerka River (Pyhäjöki River) which flows to the west and drains into Lake Komsomolskoye. In its turn, Lake Komsomolskoye drains into Vesyolaya River, a tributary of the Vuoksi River. The main tributary of the lake is River Luchik, flowing from the north.

Lake Otradnoye has an irregular shape with two bays separated by a peninsula. There are several islands on the lake, the two biggest ones are Barsukovy and Troynoy Islands.

The shores of the lake are populated, with the settlements of Otradnoye, Plodovoye, Uralskoye, Solnechnoye, Kutuzovskoye, Yablonovka, Krasnopolye, and Tsvetkovo all are located at or close to the shore. Roads run along all shores of the lake except for the eastern one. A stretch of the A129 highway connecting Saint Petersburg and Sortavala via Priozersk runs along the western shore, whereas other roads are local and have access to A129, as well as to the shore of Lake Ladoga. The Saint Petersburg – Hiitola railroad runs along the western shore of the lake as well, with Otradnoye being the only railway platform close to the lakeshore.

References

Otradnoye
Karelian Isthmus
LOtradnoye